Gibberula fortisminor is a species of very small sea snail, a marine gastropod mollusc or micromollusc in the family Cystiscidae.

Description
The length of the shell attains 1.72 mm.

Distribution
This marine species occurs in the West Indies off St. Vincent and the Grenadines.

References

fortisminor
Gastropods described in 2008